Gonzalo Renzo Vera (born 1 June 1983) is an Argentine professional footballer who plays as a defender for Gimnasia y Esgrima.

Career
Vera's career began in 2003 with Unión Santa Fe. He left the club nine years later in 2012, following two goals in one hundred and ninety-six appearances over seasons in Primera B Nacional and the Argentine Primera División. During his time with Unión Santa Fe, Vera spent periods out on loan to Ferro Carril Oeste and Tigre; making a total of thirty-five appearances. 2012 saw Vera join Independiente Rivadavia of Primera B Nacional. He made his debut on 8 September against Defensa y Justicia, prior scoring his first Independiente Rivadavia goal versus Sarmiento on 20 April 2013.

Ahead of the 2013–14 Primera B Nacional season, Vera joined Talleres. He went on to make thirty-two appearances as Talleres were relegated to Torneo Federal A. He departed the club soon after, signing for San Martín in June 2014. San Martín won promotion to the Primera División in his first season, during which he scored twice in nineteen matches. After one season with San Martín in the top-flight, Vera returned to Primera B Nacional on 1 January 2016 after agreeing to rejoin former club Ferro Carril Oeste. On 18 July 2016, Primera División side Patronato signed Vera.

Career statistics
.

References

External links

1983 births
Living people
People from Paraná, Entre Ríos
Argentine footballers
Association football defenders
Primera Nacional players
Argentine Primera División players
Unión de Santa Fe footballers
Ferro Carril Oeste footballers
Club Atlético Tigre footballers
Independiente Rivadavia footballers
Talleres de Córdoba footballers
San Martín de San Juan footballers
Club Atlético Patronato footballers
Gimnasia y Esgrima de Mendoza footballers
Sportspeople from Entre Ríos Province